The 1961 Kentucky Derby was the 87th running of the Kentucky Derby. The race took place on May 6, 1961.

Full results

References

1961
Kentucky Derby
Derby
Kentucky
Kentucky Derby